Cassiope lycopodioides, Haida Gwaii mountain-heather or clubmoss mountain heather, is a plant species native to North America.

Distribution
It is found in southern Alaska, British Columbia, and the US State of Washington.

It is found on rocky slopes in arctic and alpine tundra at elevations up to 2000 m. In Washington, it is reported only from King County. The specific epithet "lycopodioides" refers to the plant's superficial resemblance to some species of clubmoss (Lycopodium sensu lato).

Subspecies
Cassiope lycopodioides subsp. cristapilosa, known only from the Haida Gwaii (formerly called the Queen Charlotte Islands), is recognized as a distinct taxon by some authorities but not others.

Description
Cassiope lycopodioides is a perennial herb forming mats lying close to the ground. Leaves are narrow, up to 3 mm long, closely pressed against the stem. Flowers are white, bell-shaped, up to 20 mm across.

References

Ericaceae
Flora of Alaska
Flora of British Columbia
Flora of Washington (state)
Haida Gwaii
Flora without expected TNC conservation status